Paul Peter Rao (June 15, 1899 – November 30, 1988) was a judge of the United States Court of International Trade.

Education and career

Born June 15, 1899, in Prizzi, Italy, Rao served in the United States Navy from 1917 to 1919. He received a Bachelor of Laws in 1923 from the Fordham University School of Law. He served as an Assistant District Attorney for New York County, New York from 1925 to 1927. He worked in private practice from 1927 to 1941. He was a candidate for Justice of the New York Supreme Court in 1941. He was the Assistant United States Attorney General in charge of customs from 1941 to 1948.

Federal judicial service

Rao received a recess appointment from President Harry S. Truman on June 22, 1948, to a seat on the United States Customs Court vacated by Judge David Hayes Kincheloe. He was nominated to the same position by President Truman on January 13, 1949. He was confirmed by the United States Senate on January 31, 1949, and received his commission on February 2, 1949. Rao was initially appointed as a Judge under Article I, but the court was raised to Article III status by operation of law on July 14, 1956, and Rao thereafter served as an Article III Judge. He served as Chief Judge from 1965 to 1971. Rao was reassigned by operation of law to the United States Court of International Trade on November 1, 1980, to a new seat authorized by 94 Stat. 1727. His service terminated on November 30, 1988, due to his death in New York City. He was succeeded by Judge Richard W. Goldberg.

References

Sources
 

1899 births
1988 deaths
Judges of the United States Court of International Trade
Fordham University School of Law alumni
Judges of the United States Customs Court
United States Article I federal judges appointed by Harry S. Truman
20th-century American judges